The 1997 Asian Junior Athletics Championships was the seventh edition of the international athletics competition for Asian under-20 athletes, organised by the Asian Athletics Association. It took place from 4–7 November in Bangkok, Thailand. A total of 41 events were contested, 22 for male athletes and 19 for female athletes.

Medal summary

Men

Women

1997 Medal Table

References

Results
Asian Junior Championships 1997. World Junior Athletics History. Retrieved on 2013-10-19.

External links
Asian Athletics official website

1997 sports events in Bangkok
Asian Junior Championships
November 1997 sports events in Thailand
Asian Junior Athletics Championships
International athletics competitions hosted by Thailand
Asian Junior Athletics Championships
1997 in youth sport